Gudia or Guria or Gudiya (also known as Madhuvaishya) is a caste found in the Indian state of Odisha and Chhatishgarh, also a small population in Andhra Pradesh. They are also called as Modak in West Bengal and are the regional name of northern states Halwai caste. Traditionally their occupation is making of various type of sweets for village ceremonies and festive occasion and subsist on this business. They are also supplier of offerings for village deity. Nowadays they have opened their modern sweet stalls in markets for better business.

Social Status
The Gudias are classified under  Other Backward Classes in both the state of Odisha, Chhattisgarh and West Bengal.

References

Social groups of Odisha
Social groups of Andhra Pradesh
Indian castes
Social groups of Chhattisgarh